John Sidney Reid (November 27, 1918 – May 17, 1954) was an American competitive sailor and Olympic medalist. He won a silver medal in the Star class at the 1952 Summer Olympics in Helsinki, together with John Price.

References

External links
 
 
 

1918 births
1954 deaths
American male sailors (sport)
Olympic silver medalists for the United States in sailing
Sailors at the 1952 Summer Olympics – Star
Medalists at the 1952 Summer Olympics